The Latin Bit is an album by American jazz guitarist Grant Green featuring performances recorded in 1962 and released on the Blue Note label. It is a loose concept album inspired by Latin American music. It features tenor saxophonist Ike Quebec, pianists Sonny Clark and John Adriano Acea, bassist Wendell Marshall and percussionists Willie Bobo, Garvin Masseaux and “Patato” Valdes.

Reception

The Allmusic review by Michael G. Nastos awarded the album 3½ stars and stated "This CD always yielded mixed results for staunch fans of Green, but a revisit shows it to be a credible effort, even if slightly flawed in part".

Track listing
All compositions by Grant Green except where noted
 "Mambo Inn" (Mario Bauzá, Edgar Sampson, Bobby Woodlen) – 5:52
 "Bésame Mucho" (Consuelo Velázquez) – 7:12
 "Mama Inez" (L. Wolfe Gilbert, Eliseo Grenet) – 6:42
 "Brazil" (Ary Barroso) – 5:01
 "Tico Tico" (Zequinha de Abreu) – 7:46
 "My Little Suede Shoes" (Charlie Parker) – 6:23

Bonus track on CD reissue:
"Blues for Juanita" – 7:06
 "Granada" (Agustín Lara) – 6:27
 "Hey There" (Richard Adler, Jerry Ross) – 7:24

Recorded on April 26 (tracks 1-7) and September 7 (tracks 8-9), 1962.

Personnel
Grant Green - guitar
Ike Quebec - tenor saxophone (tracks 8-9)
John Adriano Acea (tracks 1-7), Sonny Clark (tracks 8-9) - piano
Wendell Marshall - bass
Willie Bobo - drums
Carlos "Patato" Valdes - conga (tracks 1-6, 8-9)
Garvin Masseaux - chekere (tracks 1-6)

Charts

References 

Blue Note Records albums
Grant Green albums
1963 albums
Albums produced by Alfred Lion
Albums recorded at Van Gelder Studio